Seeadler Harbor, also known as Port Seeadler, is located on Manus Island, Admiralty Islands, Papua New Guinea and played an important role in World War II. In German, "Seeadler" means sea eagle, pointing to German colonial activity between 1884 and 1919 in that area. The bay was named in 1900 after the German cruiser SMS Seeadler.

History

On 29 February 1944, General Douglas MacArthur led Operation Brewer to take the islands from the Japanese who had occupied them beginning in 1942. The islands were secured by the Americans on 19 March 1944, who then built a large base at Seeadler Harbor including wharves and an airbase, Manus Naval Base. This US Naval Advance Base served as a staging area for further World War II operations in New Guinea and the Philippines.

 exploded accidentally while moored in Seeadler Harbor on 10 November 1944. The ship was carrying ammunition and the tremendous explosion caused 432 fatalities, 371 wounded, damage to surrounding ships and base from debris and sinking or severely damaging 22 smaller craft.

A Japanese Mitsubishi A6M reconnaissance aircraft reported "two large aircraft carriers" at Seeadler Harbor on 22 April 1945, which were actually the U.S. Navy's Large Auxiliary Floating Dry Docks USS ABSD-2 and USS ABSD-4. Two Nakajima B5N torpedo bombers attacked the floating drydocks five nights later. Both were hit but received only moderate damage to a single pontoon each.

The wrecks of the sections of Large auxiliary floating drydock USS ABSD-4 and an Imperial Japanese ship amongst others are located within the harbor.

Gallery

References

Further reading
 - full text
Seeadler (Sea Eagle - German) 1916 WindJammer Sailboat used for reconnaissance by the German Navy It was converted from a boat of commerce to  a war and spyship in disguise.  The Captain was Count Luckner according to his biography written by Lowell Thomas, "The Sea Devil published in 1928".   The strategy for using a Sailboat versus a coal steam driven boat was two fold.   First, to be less reliant on coal since it was not always readily available on the shipping routes.  And 2nd, to allow the ship to sail further and avoid ports that would bring unwanted attention.

External links
Manusisland.com: Manus Island website

Admiralty Islands
Ports and harbours of Papua New Guinea
History of Papua New Guinea
Manus Province
German New Guinea
Papua New Guinea in World War II